Odalys Mayrín Rivas Espinoza (born 9 October 1998) is a Peruvian footballer who plays as a defender for Club Universitario de Deportes and the Peru women's national team.

International career
Rivas represented Peru at the 2017 Bolivarian Games. At senior level, she played the 2018 Copa América Femenina.

References

1998 births
Living people
Women's association football defenders
Women's association football forwards
Women's association football midfielders
Peruvian women's footballers
Peru women's international footballers
Club Universitario de Deportes footballers